The Sony Xperia Z3 Compact is an Android smartphone produced by Sony. As part of the Z Series, the Z3 Compact is a scaled-down version of the Sony Xperia Z3 and was unveiled during a press conference in IFA 2014 on 4 September 2014. Like the preceding Z1 Compact (as no Z2 Compact was produced), the Z3 Compact is water-proof with an IP rating of IP65 and IP68. The phone features a new display, a Qualcomm Snapdragon 801 processor, and has the ability to record 4K videos.

Design
The Z3 Compact is designed with what Sony describes as "omni-balance", which is focused on balance and symmetry. Instead of a metal frame, the phone has curved edges and translucent plastic with tempered glass on the front and back. Measuring 8.6 mm thick, the device is thicker than the Z3, but is lighter, weighing at 129 g, due to its smaller size.

Specifications

Hardware
The Sony Xperia Z3 Compact features a 4.6 inch BRAVIA IPS Triluminos display with a resolution of 720 by 1280 pixels (HD) with a pixel density of 319 ppi. With Live LED technology, it combines red and green phosphorus with blue LEDs to produce brighter and more uniform light without over-saturation, allowing the display to reproduce colors that are more vibrant and brighter.

It comes with a 20.7 megapixel camera, the same as the Z3, with an Exmor RS sensor and an ISO rating of 12800, designed to improve image quality in low light conditions. The camera features Sony G Lens, which is aimed at giving a wider frame for taking photos, and is also capable of filming in 4K.

On the inside, the Xperia Z3 Compact features a quad-core Qualcomm Snapdragon 801 processor (a tweaked version of the Snapdragon 800) clocked at 2.5 GHz with a high capacity 2600 mAh battery, 2 GB of RAM and 16 GB of storage, about 11 GB of which are available for the user and supporting a microSD card.

Software
The Z3 Compact initially ran Android 4.4.4 KitKat with Sony's custom launcher and some additional applications, such as Sony's media applications (Walkman, Album and Movies). The Z3 Compact can play PlayStation 4 games via Remote Play.

Sony began an upgrade for both the Z3 Compact and the Z3 to Android 5.0 "Lollipop" and announced upgrades for other Xperia Z devices in March 2015.  Starting in July 2015, Sony released an Android 5.1.1 update for the Z2, Z3 and Z3 Compact, with the other Xperia Z devices following shortly after.  On 6 October 2015, Sony confirmed that the Xperia Z3 Compact will be updated to Android 6.0 Marshmallow.  Sony released the official Android 6.0.1 Marshmallow update in April 2016.

The bootloader can be unlocked on both Z3 Compact and Z3 in order to install a custom ROM, but will void the warranty and delete the DRM keys, disabling the camera noise reduction feature and access to Sony Entertainment Network.

Reception

Critical reception
The Z3 Compact received generally positive reviews, with PC Advisor describing it as a great little smartphone offering everything available on the full-size Z3, with a design that is thinner and lighter with a larger display than the previous Z1 Compact. The Verge praised the Z3 Compact's small size while retaining the excellent battery life and performance specs of the Z3 flagship, drawing an analogy between the iPhone 6 and iPhone 6 Plus which shared most of their hardware despite the size difference, the only caveat was that the Z3 Compact had a plastic frame compared to the full-size Z3's metal frame. The Register praised the phone for its outstanding battery life.

Issues
The Z3 Compact has been widely reported to develop two serious issues: 

 The touchscreen starts to fail at the top and bottom edges; this becomes critical when the virtual back/home/menu navigation buttons stop working.  A workaround from the Sony support forum uses Minimal ADB to reduce the usable screen height (adb shell wm overscan 0,30,0,30); another workaround is to use third party virtual button software. As an emergency measure, a mouse can be connected using an on-the-go USB cable.
 With Android 6.0.1 (Marshmallow), Bluetooth blocks deep sleep mode and the battery drains quickly.  Turning off Bluetooth is a work-around.

References

External links

Android (operating system) devices
Mobile phones introduced in 2014
Digital audio players
Mobile phones with 4K video recording
Discontinued flagship smartphones
Sony smartphones